Lost and Found is the debut album by Jason & the Scorchers, released in 1985.

Released by EMI America, the album is regarded as the band's best.

Reception
AllMusic's Mark Deming called Lost & Found "the best record this fine band would ever make." No Depression also viewed it as the band's best. Billboard called it "ragged but righteous." Trouser Press wrote that "more than just a pedigree to brag about, the band’s genuine hick beginnings make them a lot less inhibited and more apt to cross from cool to corny, punk to heavy metal without fretting much about it."

The band made a music video for "White Lies," which got regular airplay on MTV in the 1980s.

Track listing

Side one 
 Last Time Around 3:06 (Ringenberg, Baggs, Johnson, Hodges)
 White Lies 3:19 (Baggs, Napier)
 If Money Talks 2:33 (Baggs, Napier)
 I Really Don't Want To Know 4:29 (Don Robertson, Howard Barnes)
 Blanket of Sorrow 2:19 (Ringenberg)
 Shop It Around 2:58 (Ringenberg)

Side two 
 Lost Highway 2:00 (Payne)
 Still Tied 3:20 (Ringenberg)
 Broken Whiskey Glass 3:50 (Ringenberg)
 Far Behind 3:50 (Johnson, Baggs)
 Change the Tune 2:39 (Johnson, Ringenberg)

Charts

Personnel 
 Jason Ringenberg - vocals, harmonica, acoustic guitar
 Warner Hodges - electric guitar, acoustic guitar, mandolin, steel guitar, Nashville high string acoustic
 Perry Baggs - drums, vocals
 Jeff Johnson - bass guitar, acoustic guitar, vocals

Technical
 Terry Manning - producer
 Warner Hodges - associate producer
 Jeff Johnson - associate producer
 R. Eli Ball - executive producer

References 

1985 albums
Jason & the Scorchers albums